Elachista luqueti is a moth of the family Elachistidae that is endemic to  Spain.

References

luqueti
Moths described in 1992
Endemic fauna of Spain
Moths of Europe